The 2008 Ford 400, a  race, was the concluding event of the 2008 NASCAR Sprint Cup season along with the 2008 Chase for the Sprint Cup, and  decides the Sprint Cup Champion for the 2008 season, this race was historic for being the race where Jimmie Johnson became the second driver (after Cale Yarborough) to win the Sprint Cup title three years in a row.  The 267-lap race on the  track was held on November 16 at Homestead-Miami Speedway in Homestead, Florida. ABC covered the race beginning at 3 PM US EST and MRN along with Sirius Satellite Radio had radio coverage starting at that same time.

The race also served as the final event of Ford Championship Weekend, which also includes the Craftsman Truck Series Ford 200 and Nationwide Series Ford 300 races on Friday and Saturday of that weekend, also serving as the season finales for those series as well.

Pre-Race News
All Jimmie Johnson had to do to clinch the 2008 Chase for the Sprint Cup Championship is one of the following as he will start the race per the Top 35 Owners Points rule:
Finish 36th without leading a lap;
Finish 37th and lead at least one lap;
Finish 39th and lead the most laps in the race;
In an interview during the pre-race for the Checker O'Reilly Auto Parts 500 this past week, NASCAR chairman Brian France stated that he isn't certain any of the USA's "Big Three" automakers (General Motors, Chrysler Corporation and Ford Motor Company) would continue their involvement in NASCAR while in these current tough economic times, but should their funding of race teams suffer due to the crisis in the credit markets, stock car racing would remain a viable, healthy sport.
Brian Vickers (#84) and Scott Speed (#83) will swap cars for this race in an attempt to put the #84 back in the top 35 in owner points. Earlier, Mark Martin was to have driven the #84 Team Red Bull Toyota, but that move was nixed by General Motors executives. Martin, who will move to the #5 Hendrick Motorsports Chevrolet next season, ran his last race for Dale Earnhardt, Inc. last week in the #8 Chevy, and Aric Almirola will drive that car full-time in 2009. In the end, the #84 finished the season 35th in points.
DEI will merge with Chip Ganassi Racing for the 2009 season and will be renamed Earnhardt Ganassi Racing with Felix Sabates, run Chevrolets and have Almirola (#8), Martin Truex Jr. (#1), Juan Pablo Montoya (#42) and one other driver for the #41 car to be announced.  As a result, DEI's #15 (driven by Paul Menard, who moves to Yates Racing in 2009) and #01 (for Regan Smith) along with Ganassi's #40 team will close.

Qualifying
Surprises were abound in the qualifying session, as David Reutimann won his first pole position in his career.  Regan Smith wrapped up the Rookie of the Year award as Sam Hornish Jr. failed to make the field. Jimmie Johnson started 30th and Carl Edwards would start at fourth.

Results
1-Carl Edwards

2-Kevin Harvick

3-Jamie Mcmurray

4-Jeff Gordon

5-Clint Bowyer

6-Kasey Kahne

8-Travis Kvapil

9-Tony Stewert

10-Martin Truex Jr

Aftermath

With the 15th-place finish, Jimmie Johnson made history as he became just the second Sprint Cup driver to win three titles in a row. The response from NASCAR fans was phenomenal, as he won many accolades and was celebrated worldwide after his championship victory. Jimmie ended up beating 2nd place Carl Edwards by a total of 69 points.

Failed to Qualify: Sam Hornish Jr. (#77), Ken Schrader (#96), Max Papis (#13)

References

Ford 400
Ford 400
NASCAR races at Homestead-Miami Speedway
November 2008 sports events in the United States